Smith Bay is an estuary in the Beaufort Sea that supports a wide range of fish, birds, and marine mammals. It is located northeast of Point Barrow, Alaska. The Bureau of Ocean Energy Management recognizes the southeastern portion of Barrow Canyon, which covers some, but not all, of Smith Bay, as an Environmentally Important Area.

Geography
Approximately 150 miles west of Prudhoe Bay, Alaska, Smith Bay stretches from Dease Inlet, Alaska to Cape Halkett, Alaska. Bordered by barrier islands that separate the shallow, brackish waters from the Beaufort Sea, several slow-moving rivers flow into this region. Along with its adjacent waters, Smith Bay is a shallow-water estuary.

Fauna
Smith Bay is a significant hotspot for pinnipeds. The nearshore areas are important habitat for ringed seals that come to the landfast ice during the winter and spring to give birth.

Polar bears and bowhead whales rely on Smith Bay for important foraging habitat. Polar bears have been observed using Smith Bay as a major maternal denning area to raise their young.

Many species of birds, including yellow-billed loons, king eiders, Arctic terns, black-legged kittiwakes, glaucous and Sabine's gulls, king eiders, long-tailed ducks, and red phalaropes, are found in Smith Bay.

Oil discovery
There is a known oil seep at Cape Simpson on the western side of Smith Bay. In 2015 and 2016, Caelus Energy Alaska drilled two exploration wells in the southern part of the bay. In October 2016, the company announced what it called a major oil discovery in the bay and said it would drill a third well in January 2018 and proceed with permitting a pipeline afterwards. A pipeline under the Chukchi Sea or a pipeline on land close to "Qupaluk" (“small bird” in the Inupiaq language) would be required, threatening the habitat of at least 30,000 migratory birds.

References

Further reading
What We Can Learn From Remarkable Smith Bay

Bays of Alaska